The conditions governing sex in space (intercourse, conception and procreation while weightless) have become a necessary study due to plans for long-duration space missions. Issues include disrupted circadian rhythms, radiation, isolation, stress, and the physical act of intercourse in zero or minimal gravity.

Overview
Human sexual activity in the weightlessness of outer space presents difficulties due to Newton's third law. According to the law, if the couple remain attached, their movements will counter each other. Consequently, their actions will not change their velocity unless they are affected by another, unattached, object. Some difficulty could occur due to drifting into other objects. If the couple have a combined velocity relative to other objects, collisions could occur. The discussion of sex in space has also raised the issue of conception and pregnancy in space.

, with NASA planning lunar outposts and possibly long-duration missions, the topic has taken a respectable place in life sciences. Despite this, some researchers have argued that national and private space agencies have yet to develop any concrete research and plans to address human sexuality in space. Dubé and colleagues (2021) proposed that NASA should embrace the discipline of space sexology by integrating sex research into their Human Research Program. Santaguida and colleagues (2022) have further argued that space agencies and private companies should invest in this discipline to address the potential for sexual harassment and assault in space contexts.

Physiological issues
Numerous physiological changes have been noted during spaceflight, many of which may affect sex and procreation. Such effects would be a result of factors including gravity changes, radiation, noise, vibration, isolation, disrupted circadian rhythms, stress, or a combination of these factors.

Gravity and microgravity
The primary issue to be considered in off-Earth reproduction is the lack of gravitational acceleration.  Life on Earth, and thus the reproductive and ontogenetic processes of all life, evolved under the constant influence of the Earth's 1g gravitational field. It is important to study how space environment affects critical phases of mammalian reproduction and development as well as events surrounding fertilization, embryogenesis, pregnancy, birth, postnatal maturation, and parental care. 

Studies conducted on rats revealed that, although the fetus developed properly once exposed to normal gravity, rats raised in microgravity lacked the ability to right themselves. Another study examined mouse embryo fertilization in microgravity. Although this resulted in healthy mice once implanted at normal gravity, the fertilization rate was lower for the embryos fertilized in microgravity. Currently no mice or rats have developed while in microgravity throughout the entire life cycle.

2Suit

The 2suit (alternately 2-Suit or twosuit) is a garment designed to facilitate low-effort sex in weightless environments such as outer space, or on planets with low gravity. The flight garment, invented by American novelist Vanna Bonta, was one of the subjects of the show The Universe, a 2008 History Channel television documentary, in its episode "Sex in Space",  about the biological and emotional implications of human migration, and reproduction beyond Earth. The 2suit was further discussed by writers online.

Planned attempts
In June 2015, Pornhub announced its plans to make the first pornographic film in space. It launched a crowdfunding campaign to fund the effort, dubbed Sexploration, with the goal of raising $3.4 million in 60 days. The campaign only received pledges for $236,086. If funded, the film would have been slated for a 2016 release, following six months of training for the two performers and six-person crew. Though it claimed to be in talks with multiple private spaceflight carriers, the company declined to name names "for fear that would risk unnecessary fallout" from the carriers. A Space.com article about the campaign mentioned that in 2008, Virgin Galactic received and rejected a $1 million offer from an undisclosed party to shoot a sex film on board SpaceShipTwo.

Adult film actress CoCo Brown had begun certifying for a co-pilot seat in the XCOR Lynx spaceplane, which would have launched in a suborbital flight in 2016 and spent a short amount of time in zero-gravity. However, XCOR declared bankruptcy before ever flying a space tourist.

Short of actual space, the adult entertainment production company Private Media Group has filmed a movie called The Uranus Experiment: Part Two where an actual zero-gravity intercourse scene was accomplished with a reduced-gravity aircraft. The filming process was particularly difficult from a technical and logistical standpoint. Budget constraints allowed for only one  shot, featuring the actors Sylvia Saint and Nick Lang.

In popular culture
Science fiction writer and futurist Isaac Asimov, in a 1973 article "Sex in a Spaceship", conjectured what sex would be like in the weightless environment of space, anticipating some of the benefits of engaging in sex in an environment of microgravity.

On July 23, 2006, a Sex in Space panel was held at the Space Frontier Foundation's annual conference. Speakers were science journalist-author Laura Woodmansee, who presented her book Sex in Space; Jim Logan, the first graduate of a new aerospace medicine residency program to be hired by NASA's Johnson Space Center in Houston; and Vanna Bonta, an American poet, novelist, and actress who had recently flown in zero gravity and had agreed to an interview for Woodmansee's book. The speakers made presentations that explored "the biological, emotional, and ... physical issues that will confront people moving [off Earth] into the space environment." NBC science journalist Alan Boyle reported on the panel, opening a world discussion of a topic previously considered taboo.

"Sex in Space" was the title of an episode of the History Channel documentary television series The Universe in 2008. The globally distributed show was dubbed into foreign languages, opening worldwide discussion about what had previously been avoided as a taboo subject. Sex in space became a topic of discussion for the long-term survival of the human species, colonization of other planets, inspired songs, and humanized reasons for space exploration.

The idea of sex in space appears frequently in science fiction.  Arthur C. Clarke claimed to first address it in his 1973 novel Rendezvous with Rama.

See also

References

Footnotes

General references

External links
Adventures in Space, The Zero-G Spot, by Michael Behar; OUTSIDE Magazine, December 2006
Outer-space sex carries complications By Alan Boyle, MSNBC July 24, 2006. Concept of "2suit"  design of American writer Vanna Bonta.
Space sex hoax rises again by James Oberg
Pregnancy in Space Seems Possible
Astronauts test sex in space - but did the earth move? The Guardian, February 24, 2000
Virgin Galactic rejects $1 million space porn by Peter B. de Selding, MSNBC, October 2, 2008
Has anyone ever had sex in space? from The Straight Dope by Cecil Adams, February 28, 1997
Space Frontier Foundation's media archives for the SFF1484 panel "Sex in Space" from the 2006 "New Space Return to the Moon Conference" featuring authors Laura Woodmansee, and Vanna Bonta with NASA physician Dr. John Logan.
From Russia... with Love (propaganda-style interview with Russian "space procreation" specialist)
 The Case for Space Sexology
 Love and rockets: We need to figure out how to have sex in space for human survival and well-being  

human sexuality
human spaceflight